Kropp may refer to:

People with the surname
 Göran Kropp (1966-2002), Swedish adventurer and mountaineer 
 Jenny Kropp (born 1979), American female beach volleyball.
 Lloyd Kropp (born 1937), American novelist, composer, and educator.
 Tom Kropp (born 1953), American former professional basketball player.
 Tori Kropp, American pregnancy, woman's health, and early parenting expert
 William Kropp (born 1990), American professional golfer

Places
 Kropp, a town in Schleswig-Flensburg district of Schleswig-Holstein, Germany
 Kropp (Amt), a former collective municipality in Schleswig-Flensburg district of Schleswig-Holstein, Germany
 Kropp-Stapelholm, a collective municipality in Schleswig-Flensburg district of Schleswig-Holstein, Germany

Music
 Palaye Royale, American rock band formed under the name Kropp Circle

German-language surnames
Dutch-language surnames